B. lutea may refer to:

 Banisteriopsis lutea, a psychoactive plant
 Beatonia lutea, a South American plant
 Besleria lutea, a plant with small seeds
 Betula lutea, a birch native to eastern North America
 Blepharoneura lutea, a fruit fly
 Bomarea lutea, a plant endemic to Ecuador
 Borsonia lutea, a sea snail
 Botryosphaeria lutea, a sac fungus
 Brodiaea lutea, a plant native to the United States
 Brontypena lutea, an owlet moth
 Brugmansia lutea, a South American plant